Beita District is one of three urban districts in Shaoyang City, Hunan province, China. The district is located in the northwest of the city proper and on the west shore of Zi River, it is bordered by Xinshao County to the north, Shuangqing and Daxiang Districts to the east, Shaoyang County to the south and the southwest. The district has two subdistricts, two towns and a township under its jurisdiction. the government seat is Ziyuan Community.

Administrative divisions
2 subdistricts
 Xintanzhen
 Zhuangyuanzhou

- towns

1 township
 Chenjiaqiao

References 

www.xzqh.org

External links

 
County-level divisions of Hunan
Shaoyang